Mohammad Mohammadi (born September 20, 1977) is a retired Iranian footballer who played as a goalkeeper.

Club career
He became a regular player under Rainer Zobel in Persepolis and moved to Paykan. He moved to First division team Steel Azin in 2007 and returned to Paykan and IPL. He signed for Esteghlal in July 2009.

After starting the most recent season in the IPL as a reserve, he eventually found good form and replaced Vahid Taleblou as Esteghlal's starting goalkeeper, playing in almost all key matches, including the Asian Champions League. In June 2011 he signed with Damash Gilan.

Mohammadi announced his retirement from professional football on June 19, 2014.

Club career statistics

International career
He has had many short call-ups to the national team but has actually appeared in few national team matches. On November 10, 1999 he was on the bench as Iran played Denmark. In 2005 and before the World Cup he was called up to the national team again but then-coach Branko Ivanković did not invite him again. On November 7, 2008 Ali Daei  again called up Mohammadi to the national team. He finally made an appearance in March 2009 against Kuwait as a substitute in the second half.

Honours

Club
Iran's Premier Football League
Winner: 1
2001–02 with Persepolis
Runner up: 1
2010–11 with Esteghlal

References

External links
 Mohammadi joins Los Angeles Blues
Mohammad Mohammadi at PersianLeague.com

1977 births
Living people
Iranian footballers
Iranian expatriate footballers
Iran international footballers
Persian Gulf Pro League players
Azadegan League players
Esteghlal F.C. players
Persepolis F.C. players
Paykan F.C. players
Pas players
Saipa F.C. players
Steel Azin F.C. players
Bargh Shiraz players
Damash Gilan players
Rah Ahan players
Orange County SC players
Expatriate soccer players in the United States
USL Championship players
Iranian expatriate sportspeople in the United States
Association football goalkeepers